Sophie's Choice is a 1979 novel by American author William Styron. The author's last novel, it concerns the relationships among three people sharing a boarding house in Brooklyn: Stingo, a young aspiring writer from the South, Jewish scientist Nathan Landau, and his lover Sophie, a Polish-Catholic survivor of the German Nazi concentration camps, whom Stingo befriends.

Sophie's Choice won the US National Book Award for Fiction in 1980. The novel was the basis of a 1982 film of the same name. It was controversial for the way in which it framed Styron's personal views regarding the Holocaust.

Plot summary
Stingo, a novelist who is recalling the summer when he began his first novel, has been fired from his low-level reader's job at the publisher McGraw-Hill and has moved into a cheap boarding house in Brooklyn, where he hopes to devote some months to his writing. While he is working on his novel, he is drawn into the lives of the lovers Nathan Landau and Sophie Zawistowska, fellow boarders at the house, who are involved in an intense and difficult relationship. The beautiful Sophie is Polish and Catholic, and a survivor of the Holocaust and Nazi concentration camps, while Nathan is a Jewish-American and, purportedly, a genius. Although Nathan claims to be a Harvard graduate and a cellular biologist with a pharmaceutical company, it is later revealed that this is a fabrication. Almost no one—including Sophie and Stingo—knows that Nathan has paranoid schizophrenia, and is abusing stimulants. He sometimes behaves quite normally and generously, but there are times when he becomes frighteningly jealous, violent, abusive, and delusional.

As the story progresses, Sophie tells Stingo of her past. She describes her violently anti-Semitic father, a law professor in Kraków; her unwillingness to help him spread his ideas; her arrest by the Nazis; and particularly, her brief stint as a stenographer-typist in the home of Rudolf Höss, the commander of Auschwitz, where she was interned. She specifically relates her attempts to seduce Höss in an effort to persuade him that her blond, blue-eyed, German-speaking son should be allowed to leave the camp and enter the Lebensborn program, in which he would be raised as a German child. She failed in this attempt and, ultimately, never learned of her son's fate. Only at the end of the book does the reader also learn what became of Sophie's daughter, Eva.

Eventually, Nathan's delusions lead him to believe that Stingo is having an affair with Sophie and he threatens to kill them both.

As Sophie and Stingo attempt to flee New York, Sophie reveals her deepest, darkest secret: on the night that she arrived at Auschwitz, a camp doctor made her choose which of her two children would die immediately by gassing and which would continue to live, albeit in the camp. Of her two children, Sophie chose to sacrifice her eight-year-old daughter, Eva, in a decision that has left her in mourning and filled with a guilt that Sophie cannot overcome. By now alcoholic and deeply depressed, Sophie is willing to self-destruct with Nathan, who has already tried to persuade her to commit suicide with him. Despite Stingo proposing marriage and a shared night that relieves Stingo of his virginity and fulfills many of his sexual fantasies, Sophie disappears, leaving only a note in which she says that she must return to Nathan.

Upon arriving back in Brooklyn, Stingo is devastated to discover that Sophie and Nathan have committed suicide by ingesting sodium cyanide.

Inspiration and themes

Themes
Sylvie Mathé notes that Styron's "position" in the writing of this novel was made clear in his contemporary interviews and essays, in the latter case, in particular "Auschwitz", "Hell Reconsidered", and "A Wheel of Evil Come Full Circle", and quotes Alvin Rosenfeld's summary of Styron's position, where Rosenfeld states that:

Rosenfeld, summarizing, states, "The drift of these revisionist views, all of which culminate in Sophie's Choice, is to take the Holocaust out of Jewish and Christian history and place it within a generalized history of evil." Mathé reinforces Rosenfeld's conclusion with a quote from Styron himself, who stated in his "Hell Reconsidered" essay that "the titanic and sinister forces at work in history and in modern life… threaten all men, not only Jews." She goes on to note that Styron's choices to represent these ideas, and to incorporate them so clearly into the narrative of his novel, resulted in polemic and controversy that continued, at least into the early years of the new millennium.

Plot inspiration
Sophie's Choice is partly based on the author's time in Brooklyn, where he met a refugee from Poland. He visited Auschwitz while researching the novel.

A central element of the novel's plot, the personally catastrophic choice referred to in the title, is said to have been inspired by a story of a Romani woman who was ordered by the Nazis to select which of her children was to be murdered, which Styron attributes to Hannah Arendt's Eichmann in Jerusalem. However, Ira Nadel claims that the story is found in Arendt's The Origins of Totalitarianism. In that book, Arendt argues that those who ran the camps perpetrated an "attack on the moral person":

Arendt herself cites Albert Camus' Twice a Year (1947) for the story (without providing a pinpoint reference). Twice a Year was a literary book which contained in its 1946/1947 publication the text of Camus' The Crisis of Man, wherein four moral contradictions and dilemma are exampled, the Greek mother's exposure being one. Camus read this, his essay complete, at Columbia University March 28, 1946.

Reception and controversies

Critical reception
In his review of the novel in the New York Times, John Gardner takes it as an example of Southern Gothic and writes that it "is a splendidly written, thrilling book, a philosophical novel on the most important subject of the 20th century. If it is not, for me, a hands-down literary masterpiece, the reason is that, in transferring the form of the Southern Gothic to this vastly larger subject, Styron has been unable to get rid of or even noticeably tone down those qualities — some superficial, some deep — in the Southern Gothic that have always made Yankees squirm."

Sophie's Choice won the US National Book Award for Fiction in 1980, against competition from Just Above My Head by James Baldwin, The Executioner's Song by Norman Mailer, The Ghost Writer by Philip Roth, and Endless Love by Scott Spencer (where the Pulitzer for fiction and the Nobel for literature for that year went, respectively, to Norman Mailer for The Executioner's Song and to Czeslaw Milosz for his body of poetry and other work).

Sophie's Choice was banned  by the South African government in November 1979 for being a sexually explicit work.

Controversies

At publication
Sophie's Choice generated significant controversy at time of its publication. It was banned in South Africa, censored in the Soviet Union, and banned in Communist Poland for "its unflinching portrait of Polish anti-Semitism".

Sylvie Mathé notes that Sophie's Choice, which she refers to as a "highly controversial novel", appeared in press in the year following the broadcast of the NBC miniseries Holocaust (1978), engendering a period in American culture where "a newly-raised consciousness of the Holocaust was becoming a forefront public issue." Mathé says:

Here, the reference to a "limit event" (synonymous with "limit case" and "limit situation") is to a concept deriving at least from the early 1990s—Saul Friedländer, in introducing his Probing the Limits of Representation, quotes David Carroll, who refers to the Holocaust as "this limit case of knowledge and feeling"—a concept that can be understood to mean an event or related circumstance or practice that is "of such magnitude and profound violence" that it "rupture[s]... otherwise normative foundations of legitimacy and... civilising tendencies that underlie... political and moral community" (the oft-cited formulation of Simone Gigliotti).

The controversy to which Mathé is specifically referring arises from a thematic analysis which—in apparent strong consensus (e.g., see Rosenfeld's 1979 work, "The Holocaust According to William Styron")—has Styron, through the novel, his interviews, and essays:
 acknowledging Jewish suffering under the Nazis, but attempting to reorient views of the Holocaust away from its being solely aimed against the Jews, toward its encompassing Slavic and other Christians (hence the Sophie character's nationality and Catholic heritage); 
that is, it has him insisting on seeing Auschwitz in particular in more universal terms as "a murderous thrust against 'the entire human family.'" Styron further extends his argument, again with controversy:
 proposing that this more general view of the barbarism of Auschwitz (and in particular the fact that Slavic Christians were caught up in its program of forced labour and extermination) obviates the need for Christian guilt and sets aside historical arguments for Christian anti-Semitism as a causative agent in the Holocaust, and 
 suggesting that the camp's role in forced labour justified its comparison (e.g., in the writings of Rubenstein) with the American institution of slavery, even allowing the latter to be viewed more favourably.

Speaking of Styron's views as set forth in the novel and his nonfiction work, Rosenfeld refers to them as "revisionist views" that "culminate in Sophie's Choice" with an aim to "take the Holocaust out of Jewish and Christian history and place it within a generalized history of evil", and it is this specific revisionist thrust that is the substance of the novel's initial and persisting ability to engender controversy.

Later
In 2002, Styron received the Auschwitz Jewish Center Foundation's Witness to Justice Award.

Sophie's Choice has been banned in some high schools in the United States. For instance, the book was pulled from the La Mirada High School Library in California by the Norwalk-La Mirada High School District in 2002 because of a parent's complaint about its sexual content. However, a year after students protested and the American Civil Liberties Union (ACLU) sent a letter to the school district requesting that the district reverse its actions, students were again given access to the book in the school library.

Adaptations

Film

The novel was made into a film of the same name in the United States, in 1982. Written and directed by Alan J. Pakula, the film was nominated for Academy Awards for its screenplay, musical score, cinematography, and costume design, and Meryl Streep received the Academy Award for Best Actress for her performance of the title role.

Opera

The British composer Nicholas Maw wrote an opera based on the novel, which was premiered at the Royal Opera House in London in 2002, and has also been performed in Washington, Berlin and Vienna.

Publication history and related works

Selected publication history
 Styron, William (1979) Sophie's Choice, New York, NY, USA: Random House, see , accessed 7 November 2015.
 —. (1998) [1979] — (Modern Library 100 Best Novels Series), reprint, revised, New York, NY, USA: Modern Library, see , accessed 7 November 2015.
 —. (2004) [1979] — (Vintage Classics), reprint, London, ENG: Vintage, see , accessed 7 November 2015.
 —. (2010) [1979] — authorized e-book, New York, NY, USA: Open Road Media, see , accessed 7 November 2015.

Styron's related works
The following of Styron's works have been collected, per Sylvie Mathé, as relevant to the author's philosophical framework with regard to his constructing the history and characters within his novel.
 Styron, William (1974) "Auschwitz," In This Quiet Dust and Other Writings, 1993 [1982], pp. 336–339, New York, NY, USA: Vintage.
 —. (1978) "Hell Reconsidered," In This Quiet Dust and Other Writings, 1993 [1982], pp. 105–115, New York, NY, USA: Vintage.
 —. (1997) "A Wheel of Evil Come Full Circle: The Making of Sophie's Choice," The Sewanee Review (Summer), Vol. 105, No. 3, pp. 395–400.
 —. (1999) Afterword to Sophie's Choice, pp. 601–606, New York, NY, USA: Modern Library.

See also

 The Holocaust in popular culture
 Le Monde 100 Books of the Century

Notes

References

Further reading
The following appear in ascending order, by original publication date, and within the same year, alphabetical by author:
 Arendt, Hannah (1994) [1963] Eichmann in Jerusalem: A Report on the Banality of Evil, New York, NY, USA: Penguin. 
 Styron, William (1967) The Confessions of Nat Turner, New York, NY, USA: Random House.
 Styron, William (2001) [1978] "Introduction," in The Cunning of History: The Holocaust and the American Future [1975] (Rubenstein, Richard L., ed.), New York, NY, USA: Perennial. 
 Rubenstein, Richard L. (2001) [1975] The Cunning of History: The Holocaust and the American Future, New York, NY, USA: Perennial.
 Rosenfeld, Alvin H. (1979) "The Holocaust According to William Styron," Midstream, Vol. 25, No. 10 (December), pp. 43–49.
 Morris, Robert K. & Irving Malin, eds. (1981) The Achievement of William Styron, Athens, GA, USA: University of Georgia Press.
 Pearce, Richard (1981) "Sophie's Choices," pp. 284–297, in The Achievement of William Styron (Morris, Robert K. & Malin, Irving, eds.), Athens, GA, USA: University of Georgia Press.
 Krzyzanowski, Jerzy R. (1983) "What's Wrong with Sophie's Choice?," Polish American Studies, No. 1 (Spring), p. 72, see , accessed 7 November 2015.
 West, James L.W., III, ed. (1985) Conversations with William Styron, Jackson, MS, USA: University of Mississippi Press.
 Sirlin, Rhoda A. (1990) William Styron's Sophie's Choice: Crime and Self-Punishment, Ann Arbor, MI. USA: University of Michigan Research Press.
 Styron, William (1990) "Introduction," in William Styron's Sophie's Choice: Crime and Self-Punishment, Ann Arbor, MI. USA: University of Michigan Research Press.
 Friedman, Saul S., ed. (1993) Holocaust Literature: A Handbook of Critical, Historical and Literary Writings, Westport, CT, USA: Greenwood Press.
 White, Terry (1994) "Allegorical Evil, Existentialist Choice in O'Connor, Oates, and Styron," The Midwest Quarterly, Vol. 35, No. 3 (Spring), pp. 383–397.
 Cologne-Brookes, Gavin (1995) The Novels of William Styron: From Harmony to History, Baton Rouge, LA, USA: Louisiana State University Press.
 Bloom, Harold, ed. (2002) William Styron's Sophie's Choice (Modern critical interpretations series), Philadelphia, PA, USA: Chelsea House, see , accessed 7 November 2015. 
 Law, Richard G. (2002) "The Reach of Fiction: Narrative Technique in Styron's Sophie's Choice," pp. 133–150, in William Styron's Sophie's Choice, (Bloom, Harold, ed.; Modern critical interpretations series), Philadelphia, PA, USA: Chelsea House, see , accessed 7 November 2015. 
 Telpaz, Gideon (2002) "An Interview with William Styron," pp. 231–241, in William Styron's Sophie's Choice, (Bloom, Harold, ed.; Modern critical interpretations series), Philadelphia, PA, USA: Chelsea House, see , accessed 7 November 2015. 
 Oster, Sharon (2003) "The 'Erotics of Auschwitz': Coming of Age in The Painted Bird and Sophie's Choice," pp. 90–124, in Witnessing the Disaster: Essays on Representation and the Holocaust, (Bernard-Donals, Michael  & Glejzer, Richard, eds.), Madison, WI, USA: University of Wisconsin Press.
 Beranek, Stephanie (2015) [2003] "Literature—William Styron: Sophie's Choice," at London School of Journalism, June 2003, see , accessed 7 November 2015.

External links
  [Student mini-essays based on stated sources, highlighting such matters as the contemporaneous controversy associated with the novel, including critiques of the author, serving therefore as a point to other sources germane to this article.]

1979 American novels
American novels adapted into films
Novels set in Brooklyn
Fictional portrayals of schizophrenia
National Book Award for Fiction winning works
Novels about the aftermath of the Holocaust
Novels about writers
Novels by William Styron
Random House books
Fiction about suicide
Novels adapted into operas
Censored books
American philosophical novels